Acaulospora splendida is a species of fungi in the family Acaulosporaceae. Originally reported from Costa Rica in 1988, it forms arbuscular mycorrhiza and vesicles in roots.

References

External links
Index Fungorum

Diversisporales